Sussex Archaeological Collections is an annual peer-reviewed academic journal covering archaeological topics. The journal is published by the Sussex Archaeological Society and was established in 1848.

History 
The Sussex Archaeological Society was founded in the 1840s and in 1847 its members decided to create a publication relating to the history of Sussex. The society was amongst the first organisations founded to study a county's history, and by 2012 it had published the third most articles amongst journals on English counties. Owen Bedwin (editor 1979–1983) introduced anonymous reviewing for articles.

Florence Dodson was the first woman to write an article in the journal, published in 1880; no other women authored articles before 1900, though it became more common in the 1920s. A survey of articles found that between 1900 and 1950, 4% were written by women, a similar proportion to the Antiquaries Journal and Archaeologia (both published by the Society of Antiquaries of London).

The society was the first county-based archaeological society to share content through the Archaeology Data Service, an online open-access platform. Initially, volumes from 1999 onwards were freely available two years after they were published. By 2012, only the Surrey Archaeological Society had done something similar, though this later became more common and the SAS's own work available through the ADS was extended to cover everything since the journal's inception. Marking the society's 175th anniversary in 2021, volunteers at the SAS completed a project digitising and indexing the whole catalogue of the journal. The issues were made freely available online through the ADS.

Editors
In 1909, Louis Francis Salzman became the first professional archaeologist or historian to edit the journal; professionalisation became the norm. The following people are or have been [[editors-in-chief:

References

Further reading

External links

Digitised volumes available from the Archaeology Data Service

Archaeology journals
Annual journals
Publications established in 1848